161. Fighter Escadrille was a unit of the Polish Air Force at the start of the Second World War. The unit was attached to the Łódź Army.

Equipment
8 PZL P.11c and 2 PZL P.11a fighter airplanes.

Air crew

commander of the unit: kpt. pil. Władysław Szczęśniewski
deputy commander: por.pil.Władysław Goettel

Pilots:
 ppor.pil.Jan Dzwonek
 ppror.pil.Antoni Chabroszewski
 ppor.pil.Tadeusz Koc
 ppor.pil.Kazimierz Rębalski
 ppor.pil.Marian Trzebiński
 pchor.pil.Wiesław Choms
 pchor.pil.Edward Kramarski
 pchor.pil.Andrzej Malarowski
 pchor.pil.Piotr Ruszel
 plut.pil.Marian Domagała
 plut.pil.Franciszek Prętkiewicz
 kpr.pil.Feliks Gmur
 kpr.pil.Antoni Seredyn
 st.szer.pil.Karol Sumara
 st.szer.pil.Stanisław Węgliński

See also
Polish Air Force order of battle in 1939

References
 

Polish Air Force escadrilles